Sheila Turnage is an American author best known for writing Three Times Lucky, which received a Newbery Honor in 2013.

Biography
Turnage was born in Jacksonville, North Carolina and studied anthropology at East Carolina University. In addition to the Mo & Dale Mysteries, she has also written nonfiction for adults and a picture book.

References 

American children's writers
East Carolina University alumni
Living people
Newbery Honor winners
Year of birth missing (living people)
21st-century American women writers
Writers from North Carolina